Ohio's 11th congressional district encompasses portions of Cuyahoga County in the Northeast part of the state—including most of the majority-black precincts in Cleveland. It has been represented by Shontel Brown since 2021.  

Ohio has had at least 11 congressional districts since the 1820 census. The district's current configuration dates from the 1990 census, when most of the old 21st District was combined with portions of the old 20th District to form the new 11th District. Much of Akron was added to the district when the congressional map was redrawn after the 2010 census, when Ohio lost two seats in the House of Representatives. With a Cook Partisan Voting Index of D+28, it is Ohio's most Democratic district and the most Democratic district in the Midwest outside Chicago.

It was one of several districts challenged in a 2018 lawsuit seeking to overturn Ohio's congressional map due to alleged unconstitutional gerrymandering. The lawsuit describes the 11th as "a detached shoulder blade with a robotic arm" extending from Cleveland to Akron.

Following Marcia Fudge's resignation on March 10, 2021, a special election was held, with a primary on August 3 and the general election on November 2, as mandated by Ohio law. Shontel Brown won the election, and was sworn in on November 4.

Recent history
The modern era 11th district came to be as a result of redistricting following the 1990 census, and taking effect for the 1992 election. Following the retirement of Louis Stokes—who was redistricted from the now defunct 21st district to the redrawn 11th, and served three terms—Stephanie Tubbs Jones served from 1999 through August 20, 2008, when she died in office. Ohio Governor Ted Strickland ordered a special election on November 18, 2008, to fill the remaining month of Jones's term. In addition, the seat was up for election during the November 4, 2008 general election, with the winner of that election to serve a full term beginning on January 3, 2009. Marcia L. Fudge—the mayor of Warrensville Heights (a Cleveland suburb)—won both the general and special elections and was sworn in on November 19, 2008.

Fudge served eight terms (the last month of Jones's fifth term, followed by six full terms, then three months of another) when she resigned on March 10, 2021, to join President Joe Biden's cabinet as HUD Secretary. In 2021 a special election was held to fill the vacancy, which Cuyahoga County Council member and Cuyahoga County Democratic Party chair Shontel Brown won.

Election results from presidential races

List of members representing the district

Election results
This is an incomplete list of historic election results. Bold type indicates victor. Italic type indicates incumbent.

Historical district boundaries

See also
Ohio's congressional districts
List of United States congressional districts

References

 Congressional Biographical Directory of the United States 1774–present

11
Constituencies established in 1823
1823 establishments in Ohio